Payum Puli is a 2007 Indian Malayalam language action comedy film directed by Mohan Kupleri, starring Kalabhavan Mani, Rambha, Sai Kumar, Chandra Lakshman etc. It was released in 2007.

Plot

Cast 

 Kalabhavan Mani as Sharavanan
 Rambha as Malli
 Riyaz Khan as Issac John
 Sai Kumar as Josettan
 Jagathy Sreekumar as Thankappan
 Jagadish as SI Sreenivasan
 Shobha Mohan as Ravishankar's mother
 Sukumari as Malli's grandmother
 Ambika Mohan as Susie, Nainan Finance MD
 Rajesh Hebbar as Rajan Menon
 Nimisha Suresh as Maya (Malli's sister)
 Chandra Lakshman as Moosa Bhai's daughter
 TG Ravi as Moosa Bhai
 Bheeman Raghu as ACP Ramanathan
 Sadiq as Advocate
 Anand as Ravishankar
 Jagannatha Varma as Warrier (Malli's grandfather)
 Salim Kumar as Mujeeb Rahman
 Majeed as Ex MLA Mathai
 Munshi Venu as Old man at Mucheetkali
Nisha Sarang as Rukmini
Gayathri as Ramanathan's wife

Reception
Sify wrote, "Payum Puli is racy and has enough masalas to please the common man who is looking for time pass entertainment".

Soundtrack
The Music was composed by Mohan Sithara and Lyrics was written by Giressh Puthanchery and Rajeev Alunkal.

References

2007 films
2000s Malayalam-language films
Films directed by Mohan Kupleri

2007 action comedy films
Indian action comedy films